Wagontire is an unincorporated community in Harney County, Oregon, United States, along U.S. Route 395.

The community was named after nearby Wagontire Mountain. From 1986 to at least 1997, Wagontire was home to just two people: William and Olgie Warner. The Warners' property included a gas station, cafe, motel, general store, and recreational vehicle (RV) park. Also there was Wagontire Airport, across the road from the buildings. Planes flying into the airport taxied across the highway, and filled up at the gas station.

In summer 1999, the community was purchased by Ellie Downing of Burns, who moved there with her nephew, Jerry Gray.

References

External links
Historic images of Wagontire from Salem Public Library

Unincorporated communities in Harney County, Oregon
Unincorporated communities in Oregon